The Lama is a river in the Moscow and Tver Oblasts in Russia, a tributary of the Shosha. The Lama River freezes up in November and stays under the ice until late March or early April. Historically, the river was a part of the important waterway from the Volga to the Moskva. The city of Volokolamsk that has been standing on the Lama since the 12th century was previously known as Volok Lamsky (literally - Drag of Lama) after the process of a watercraft portage.

References 

Rivers of Moscow Oblast
Rivers of Tver Oblast